KVLP may refer to:

 KVLP (FM), a radio station (91.7 FM) licensed to Tucumcari, New Mexico, United States
 KVLP-LP, a radio station (101.5 FM) licensed to Visalia, California, United States